Pan Am Flight 281 was a regularly scheduled Pan American World Airways flight to San Juan, Puerto Rico.  It was hijacked on November 24, 1968, by four men from JFK International Airport, New York City to Havana, Cuba.  U.S. jet fighter aircraft followed the plane until it reached  Cuban airspace.

Two of the hijackers were apprehended in the 1970s.  Jose Rafael Rios Cruz was arrested in 1975; Miguel Castro was captured in 1976.  Both pleaded guilty; Cruz was sentenced to 15 years in prison and Castro to 12.

A third hijacker, Luis Armando Peña Soltren, lived as a fugitive in Cuba.  In October 2009, he voluntarily returned to the United States and surrendered to federal authorities.  He pleaded guilty to the hijacking on March 18, 2010. On January 4, 2011 he was sentenced to 15 years in prison, without the possibility of parole.

Alejandro Figueroa, a woman charged as a co-conspirator in the case, was acquitted in 1969.

References 

Aircraft hijackings in the United States
281
Cuba–United States relations
1968 in New York City
Aircraft hijackings
Aviation accidents and incidents in the United States in 1968
1968 in Cuba
November 1968 events in North America
 Accidents and incidents involving the Boeing 707